The Luohexi (Luohe West) railway station is a high-speed railway station of Beijing–Guangzhou–Shenzhen–Hong Kong High-Speed Railway located in Luohe, Henan, People's Republic of China.

References

Railway stations in Henan
Stations on the Shijiazhuang–Wuhan High-Speed Railway
Railway stations in China opened in 2012